Pathirappally is a coastal village in Alleppey District, Kerala state, India. It lies along the new coastal road, about 5 km from the town of Alleppey. It is a village in Mararikulam South and Aryad panchayats of Alappuzha district, Kerala.

Nearer Places
The most famous Film Studio Named Udaya Studio is situated here. KSDP (Kerala State Drugs and Pharmaceuticals Limited) is situated near this Studio.

Villages in Alappuzha district